Abacetus hexagonus is a species of ground beetle in the subfamily Pterostichinae. It was described by Straneo in 1992.

References

Beetles described in 1992
hexagonus